Anjunabeats Volume 9 is the ninth instalment in the Anjunabeats Volume compilation series mixed and compiled by British trance group Above & Beyond. It was released in the United Kingdom on 13 November 2011 by Anjunabeats.

Track listing

Release history

References

2011 compilation albums
Above & Beyond (band) albums
Anjunabeats compilation albums
Sequel albums
Electronic compilation albums